Stein House may refer to:

in the United States (by state, then city)

 Misty Mountain, Los Angeles, California
 Stein House (Ashland, Kansas), listed on the National Register of Historic Places (NRHP) in Kansas, in Clark County
 Frederick W. Stein House, Atchison, Kansas, listed on the NRHP in Atchison County, Kansas
 Daniel Stein House, Farmerville, Louisiana, listed on the NRHP in Union Parish, Louisiana
 David Bachrach House, also known as Gertrude Stein House, Baltimore, Maryland, NRHP-listed
 Earl Stein House, Midland, Michigan, listed on the NRHP in Midland County, Michigan

See also
Stine House (disambiguation)